A creamery is a place where milk and cream are processed and where butter and cheese is produced. Cream is separated from whole milk; pasteurization is done to the skimmed milk and cream separately. Whole milk for sale has had some cream returned to the skimmed milk.

The creamery is the source of butter from a dairy. Cream is an emulsion of fat-in-water; the process of churning causes a phase inversion to butter which is an emulsion of water-in-fat. Excess liquid as buttermilk is drained off in the process. Modern creameries are automatically controlled industries, but the traditional creamery needed skilled workers. Traditional tools included the butter churn and Scotch hands.

The term "creamery is sometimes used in retail trade as a place to buy milk products such as yogurt and ice cream. Under the banner of a creamery one might find a store also stocking pies and cakes or even a coffeehouse with confectionery.

See also
 List of cheesemakers
 List of dairy products

References
 
 Kanes K. Rajah & Ken J. Burgess editors (1991) Milk Fat: Production, Technology, Utilization, Society of Dairy Technology.
 R.K. Robinson editor (1994) Modern Dairy Technology, 2nd edition, Chapman & Hall,  .
 R.A. Wilbey (1994) "Production of butter and dairy based spreads", in Robinson (1994).

Butter
Food processing
Industrial processes